Dawn, Her Dad and the Tractor is a 2021 Canadian drama film, directed by Shelley Thompson. The film stars Maya Henry as Dawn MacGinnis, a young transgender woman from Nova Scotia who returns home for her mother's funeral, and tries to rebuild her relationship with her estranged father John Andrew (Robb Wells) through working together to restore John Andrew's old broken-down tractor.

The film's cast also includes Amy Groening, Reid Price, Richie Wilcox, Francine Deschepper and Taylor Olson.

The film was shot in various locations in Nova Scotia, including Windsor, Chester, Halifax and Antigonish, in 2020.

The film premiered on May 27, 2021, at the Inside Out Film and Video Festival.

It received five nominations for the Screen Nova Scotia awards in 2022, including Best Feature Film, WIFT Best Nova Scotia Director (Thompson) and ACTRA Award Outstanding Performance nominations for Francine Deschepper, Reid Price and Robb Wells.

References

External links

Dawn, Her Dad and the Tractor at Library and Archives Canada

2021 films
2021 drama films
2021 LGBT-related films
Canadian drama films
Canadian LGBT-related films
English-language Canadian films
Films shot in Nova Scotia
Films set in Nova Scotia
LGBT-related drama films
Films about trans women
2020s English-language films
2020s Canadian films